Kuruj Kollan (also Romanized as Kūrūj Kollān; also known as Kūrūch Kollān) is a village in Gafr and Parmon Rural District, Gafr and Parmon District, Bashagard County, Hormozgan Province, Iran. At the 2006 census, its population was 150, in 41 families.

References 

Populated places in Bashagard County